Mar Shimun XVII Abraham (also Simon XVII Abraham or Auraham, 1800/01– 1861) served as the Catholicos-Patriarch of the Assyrian Church of the East from c. 1820 to 1861.

He led the church from Qodshanis, (modern Konak, Hakkari) in southeastern Turkey, and tried to maintain good relations with local Ottoman authorities. In 1843, he was faced with renewed hostilities from Kurdish warlords, who attacked many Christian villages and killed 10,000 men, taking away women and children as captives, and forcing Patriarch to take refuge in Mosul. He is buried in the Church of Mar Shalita in Turkey.

See also
List of Patriarchs of the Assyrian Church of the East

References

Sources

External links 

 Official site of the Assyrian Church of the East

1861 deaths
Catholicos Patriarchs of the Assyrian Church of the East
Assyrians from the Ottoman Empire
19th-century bishops of the Assyrian Church of the East
Year of birth uncertain